Dungeon Lairs is a supplement published by Games Workshop in 1987 for the fantasy role-playing game Warhammer Fantasy Roleplay (WFRP).

Description
Dungeon Lairs is a set of generic full-colour floorplans of monster lairs for use with 25 mm miniatures in a fantasy role-playing game. The supplement contains 15 rooms on twelve A4 cardstock sheets:
 Sewer
 Underground Complex
 Troll Cave
 Chaotic Cave
 Chaotic Temple
 Ancient Temple
 Tumulus
 Goblin Hall (on two sheets)
 Mossy Cave
 Root Cave
 Flooded Cave
 Ice Cave
 Chaotic Throne Room

The supplement also includes a 12-page booklet with tables of random encounters and treasures for each of the floorplans.

Publication history
Games Workshop first published Warhammer Fantasy Roleplay in 1986. The supplement Dungeon Lairs was published the following year, a boxed set with artwork by Dave Andrews and Colin Dixon.

Reception
Graeme Davis reviewed Dungeon Lairs for White Dwarf #91, and stated that "If you use floorplans, Dungeon Lairs will definitely be a worthwhile addition to your collection. Even if you don't, it might be worth a look - the sample dungeon is readily plunderable for ideas, and the supplemental WFRP material might be useful if you GM that game."

References

Warhammer Fantasy Roleplay